The seventh season of the American horror anthology television series American Horror Story, subtitled Cult, takes place in the fictional suburb of Brookfield Heights, Michigan, during the year 2017, and centers on a cult terrorizing the residents in the aftermath of Donald Trump winning the 2016 U.S. presidential election. The smallest ensemble cast of the series, it includes Sarah Paulson, Evan Peters, Cheyenne Jackson, Billie Lourd, and Alison Pill, with all returning from previous seasons, except newcomers Lourd and Pill.  

Created by Ryan Murphy and Brad Falchuk for cable network FX, the series is produced by 20th Century Fox Television. Cult was broadcast between September 5 to November 14, 2017, consisting of 11 episodes. The subtitle was announced in July 2017. The season received mostly positive reviews from critics, although the depiction of U.S. politics received some criticism. Paulson, Peters, and Adina Porter received Saturn Awards nominations for their performances. Additionally, Paulson and Porter were nominated for Outstanding Lead Actress and Outstanding Supporting Actress in a Limited Series or Movie respectively at the 70th Primetime Emmy Awards, while Peters received a nomination for Best Actor in a Movie or Limited Series at the 8th Critics' Choice TV Awards.

Cast and characters

Main

 Sarah Paulson as Ally Mayfair-Richards and Susan Atkins
 Evan Peters as Kai Anderson, Andy Warhol, Marshall Applewhite, David Koresh, Jim Jones, Jesus, and Charles Manson
 Cheyenne Jackson as Dr. Rudy Vincent
 Billie Lourd as Winter Anderson and Linda Kasabian
 Alison Pill as Ivy Mayfair-Richards

Recurring
 Adina Porter as Beverly Hope
 Colton Haynes as Detective Jack Samuels
 Frances Conroy as Bebe Babbitt
 Billy Eichner as Harrison Wilton and Charles "Tex" Watson
 Leslie Grossman as Meadow Wilton and Patricia Krenwinkel
 Chaz Bono as Gary Longstreet
 Cooper Dodson as Ozymandias "Oz" Mayfair-Richards
 Dermot Mulroney as Bob Thompson
 Cameron Cowperthwaite as Speedwagon

Guest stars
 Emma Roberts as Serena Belinda
 Mare Winningham as Sally Keffler
 Lena Dunham as Valerie Solanas
 Tim Kang as Tom Chang
 John Carroll Lynch as Twisty the Clown
 Jorge-Luis Pallo as Pedro Morales
 Zack Ward as Roger
 Laura Allen as Rosie
 Ron Melendez as Mark
 James Morosini as R.J.
 Dot-Marie Jones as Butchy May
 Jamie Brewer as Hedda
 Rick Springfield as Pastor Charles
 Rachel Roberts as Sharon Tate
 Dennis Cockrum as Herbert Jackson
 Annie Ilonzeh as Erika

Episodes

Production

Development
On October 4, 2016, the series was renewed for a seventh cycle, which premiered on September 5, 2017. Ryan Murphy confirmed that the season will be connected to Freak Show, but will be set in modern day. In February 2017, on Watch What Happens Live, Murphy announced that the season would revolve around the 2016 U.S. election and suggested that it may feature a character based on President Donald Trump. Murphy has said that the season will be representative of both sides of the political divide. He also said that he will be "illuminating and highlighting" groups of people he believes to be "ignored by the current [Trump] administration and who are afraid and feel terrorized that their lives are going to be taken away."

It was later confirmed that the season would be set in the aftermath of the presidential election, with the first episode taking place on election night. Murphy explained it will be about "the fallout of that night, which to many people, from all sides of the camps is a horror story." He also revealed the season would not feature Donald Trump or Hillary Clinton, stating "Horror Story is always about allegory, so the election is allegory." In April 2017, Murphy confirmed that archive footage of the election night would be used in the season premiere.

Murphy revealed via Twitter that the details of the seventh season, including the title, would be revealed on July 20. He also teased that the opening sequence of the series would return in this season, following its absence in Roanoke.

On July 20, 2017, it was announced at the San Diego Comic-Con that the title of the season would be Cult. Murphy also revealed it would be set in Michigan, and confirmed it would consist of a total of 11 episodes, premiering on September 5, 2017. For the first time, the series did not air on Wednesdays but rather on Tuesdays. On August 3, 2017, online posters revealed the names of multiple characters of the season. On August 21, 2017, the opening title sequence of the season was revealed, following its absence in the previous season. That same month, Murphy confirmed that, contrary to the past seasons, Cult would not feature supernatural elements.

Casting
During the Winter 2017 TCA Press Tour, series mainstays Sarah Paulson and Evan Peters were reported to be starring as the leads in the season. In March 2017, Billy on the Street host Billy Eichner was announced to be cast in the series, playing a role in the life of Paulson's character. His character is slated for appearing in "six or seven" episodes. The next month, it was reported that Scream Queens actress Billie Lourd will also star in the seventh installment of the series. In May 2017, Leslie Grossman, who starred in Murphy's series Popular, joined the cast of the series, and Angela Bassett hinted she may return in a recurring role. Despite this, Bassett didn't appear, but she did direct the episode "Drink the Kool-Aid". Later that month, it was confirmed via set pictures that Adina Porter and Cheyenne Jackson were also returning. In June 2017, Murphy confirmed via his Instagram account that Colton Haynes, whom Murphy worked with previously on second season of Scream Queens, was joining the casting for the seventh season. Later that month, set pictures revealed that Alison Pill was joining the cast of the season, seemingly portraying the partner of Sarah Paulson's character. In July 2017, Murphy revealed via his Twitter account that Lena Dunham was joining the season. She played Valerie Solanas, author of the SCUM Manifesto and attempted murderer of Andy Warhol, via flashbacks. Murphy also confirmed the returns of Frances Conroy and Mare Winningham. Conroy has appeared in all the seasons except Hotel, while Winningham has appeared in Coven, Freak Show, and Hotel. In August 2017, Murphy confirmed the return of Emma Roberts, who appeared in Coven and Freak Show, while Roanoke actors Chaz Bono and James Morosini also confirmed their returns. In the seventh episode, Murder House, Coven, and Freak Show actress Jamie Brewer returned to the show.

On June 26, 2017, it was confirmed that Lady Gaga would not return for the seventh season due to other projects. Despite rumors, Entertainment Weekly reported on July 7, 2017, that Vera Farmiga, sister of American Horror Story actress Taissa Farmiga, would not appear in the season. Later that month, it was confirmed by The Hollywood Reporter that Kathy Bates will not appear in Cult, after four seasons of regular appearances.

Murphy also revealed via his Instagram account that Freak Show character Twisty the Clown would return in the seventh season, indicating that John Carroll Lynch would reprise his role.

Filming
In February 2017, it was announced the season would begin principal photography in June 2017. By the next month, filming was moved to May 2017. On May 24, 2017, writer and producer John J. Gray confirmed the show started filming.

Edits
On October 7, 2017, it was confirmed that the sixth episode of the season would be edited as a direct result of the 2017 Las Vegas shooting that occurred on October 1, 2017. The episode originally featured a scene lasting 2 minutes and 16 seconds where Leslie Grossman's character Meadow Wilton begins to fire at Evan Peters' character, as well as a crowd, during a campaign speech. The episode was edited to de-emphasize the violence and to mostly have it featured completely off-screen - as a result the opening sequence of the episode was cut in half, several on-screen deaths were removed and two separate close-up shots of the handgun firing were removed.

While only the edited episode was broadcast on FX, the original uncut episode was released via VOD, FXNOW and FX+.

Reception

Critical response
American Horror Story: Cult received mostly positive reviews from critics. The review aggregator Rotten Tomatoes gave the season a 73% approval rating, with an average rating of 7.05/10, based on 49 reviews. The site's consensus reads, "American Horror Story: Cult intrigues with timely, over-the-top creepiness - and lots of clowns - despite being hampered by broad political generalizations and occasional holes in the narrative's logic." On Metacritic, the season was given a score of 66 out of 100 based on 24 reviews, indicating "generally positive reviews".

Awards and nominations

In its seventh season, the series has been nominated for 25 awards, 3 of them were won.

Ratings

Home media

References

External links

 
 

2010s American drama television series
2016 United States presidential election in popular culture
2017 American television seasons
07
2010s American LGBT-related drama television series
Donald Trump in popular culture
Feminist fiction
Fratricide in fiction
Lesbian-related television shows
Mass murder in fiction
Television series about cults
Sororicide in fiction
Suicide in television
Television series set in 2016
Television series set in 2017
Television series set in 2018
Television series set in the 2010s
Television shows set in Michigan
Uxoricide in fiction
Fictional cults